Homemade Love Story is a South Korean family drama television series starring Jin Ki-joo and Lee Jang-woo. The drama aired on KBS2 from September 19, 2020 to March 7, 2021, every Saturday and Sunday from 19:55 to 21:15 (KST).

Synopsis 
Woo Jae-Hee works as an architect. His father Woo Jung-Hoo runs a big company, but Woo Jae-Hee has feuded with him over the years. After entering a university, Woo Jae-Hee lived independently and did not receive support from his father. Now, he is handsome, smart, and does good work as an architect. He meets Lee Bit Chae Woon for the first time while at a house remodelling site.

Lee Bit Chae Woon works for an interior design shop. Her job is to visit customers and help select curtains, lighting, and other design choices. Lee Bit Chae Woon and Woo Jae-Hee get into an argument at the house remodelling site. They are also both residents of Samgwang Villa. Woo Jae-Hee has warm feelings for the residents and likes the general atmosphere there. Lee Bit Chae Woon has a different view of the place. She supports her family, including her mother Lee Soon-Jung and two younger siblings. She feels burdened by having to always support them. She dreams of one day becoming a textile designer, but it's not easy for her. She also dreams of leaving Samgwang Villa and the responsibility of being the head of the household.

Cast

Starring
 Jin Ki-joo as Lee Bit Chae-won 
 Lee Jang-woo as Woo Jae-hee

Recurring

Lee family
 Jeon In-hwa as Lee Soon-jung
 Bona as Lee Hae-deun
 Ryeoun as Lee Ra-hoon

Woo family
 Jeong Bo-seok as Woo Jung-hoo
 Jin Kyung as Jung Min-jae

Kim family
 Hwang Shin-hye as Kim Jung-won
 Han Bo-reum as Jang Seo-ah
 Dong Ha as Jang Joon-ah

Tenants of Samkwang Villa
 Kim Sun-young as Lee Man-jung
 In Gyo-jin as Kim Hwak-se
 Jeon Sung-woo as Hwang Na-ro
 Kim Si-eun as Cha Ba-reun

Others
 Moon Ji-hoo as Lee Jung-woo
 Um Hyo-Sup as Park Pil-hong
 Jung Jae-soon as Lee Choon-seok
 Lee Seung-hyung as Jung Min-seok
 Lee Dong-toung as Yoo-hyeon
 Shim Young-eun 
 Park Jeong-eon
 Park Jeong-won
 Park Jung-min
 Park So-yoon
 Kang Eun-ah
 Jeon Eun-mi

Special appearances
 DIA
 Shin Seung-ho 
 Im Ye-jin

Viewership

Original soundtrack

Part 1

Awards and nominations

Notes

References

External links
  
 
 

Korean Broadcasting System television dramas
2020 South Korean television series debuts
Korean-language television shows
South Korean romantic comedy television series
Television series about families
Television series by Monster Union